Michael K. Okwo (born January 24, 1985) is a former British-American linebacker of American football. He was drafted by the Chicago Bears in the third round of the 2007 NFL Draft. He played college football at Stanford.

Early years
Born in Manchester, England, Okwo graduated from Mira Costa High School in Manhattan Beach, California in 2003.

References

External links
Indianapolis Colts bio
Stanford Cardinal bio

1985 births
Living people
Players of American football from California
Sportspeople from Redondo Beach, California
American football linebackers
Stanford Cardinal football players
Chicago Bears players
Indianapolis Colts players
Sportspeople from Manchester
English players of American football
English emigrants to the United States
Black British sportspeople
Mira Costa High School alumni